ScienceAlert is an independently run online publication and news source that publishes articles featuring scientific research, discoveries, and outcomes. The site was founded in 2004 by Julian Cribb, a science writer, to aggregate research findings from Australian universities, and it expanded in 2006 when ex-Microsoft programmer Chris Cassella took on the project of developing the website. It has readership that ranges from 11.5m to 26.5m per month. Science journalist Fiona MacDonald has been CEO since 2017.

History 
Science communicator Julian Cribb founded ScienceAlert in 2004. The website was born out of his “concern at the lack of information available about what Australians and New Zealanders achieve in science”. Chris Cassella, a former programmer for Microsoft, joined the site in order to develop new web tools. He took on this work as part of a master's degree thesis in science communication at Australia National University, where Cribb was a professor. Initially, the focus of ScienceAlert was twofold: “to both publicise Australasian scientific outcomes more widely and to encourage Australasian research institutions and funding agencies to share more of their achievements by providing a free outlet for them to do so”. Cassella is credited with bringing the site to social media, starting the ScienceAlert Facebook page in 2007. By 2011, the page had attracted a significant following among young people, reaching one million followers by 2012. By 2020, the page had slightly more than nine million followers.

In 2012, ScienceAlert received a grant from Inspiring Australia, a government initiative aimed at engaging “people who may not have had previous access to or interest in science-communication activities”. Although the website began as a project to aggregate research findings and outcomes from Australian universities, by 2019 the focus of the site had shifted toward presenting popular science to a wider audience. The shift toward mass appeal news on social media has met with some criticism. (See Controversy and criticism section, below)

In July 2019, reinforcing the site's commitment to fact-checking, ScienceAlert announced a joint partnership with Metafact. ScienceAlert republishes selected expert answers from the Metafact community across the site's multiple digital channels. ScienceAlert is owned by ScienceAlert Pty Ltd., a privately held company owned by Chris Cassella.

According to its site, ScienceAlert does not run sponsored articles nor is it affiliated with other companies or institutions. As of 2020, ScienceAlert engages more than 11 million readers per month.

Editorial staff 
In addition to Cassella and MacDonald, ScienceAlert's editorial staff is headed by Peter Dockrill, who manages the six contributing science journalists to produce the site's news. Cribb concluded his role as editor at ScienceAlert in 2015. In August 2017, Fiona MacDonald was named CEO of ScienceAlert, with Cassella acting as COO/CFO. Prior to this role, MacDonald had worked with the news site for more than a decade as an editor and then the director of content. According to The Brilliant, the editorial team has doubled since 2017.

Format 
As of August 2020, ScienceAlert had the following sections: Tech, Health, Space, Environment, Humans, Physics, Nature, Politics & Society, Comment & Opinion, and Explainers. Users are able to choose from articles that may be listed either by recency and popularity.

Controversy and criticism 
In May 2019, ScienceAlert joined the debate surrounding publications, such as The Guardian, shifting their style guide to prioritize terms such as “climate crisis or breakdown” over “climate change”. Based on evidence-based research and expert opinion, ScienceAlert shared updated definitions for the site's climate science-related terminology. Later, ScienceAlert noted that this decision led to an increase in negative comments on their Facebook page. The page comprises a small portion of the readers of the publication. The editors said that when they post articles about climate news, “with astonishing speed and ferocity the comment section becomes a hot-pot of climate denialism”. The editors developed a policy of dealing with the social media issue by asking that, rather than adding fuel to the onslaught, readers of the page cooperate in a reporting scheme that could enable quick blocking of the disruptive sources and the alternative accounts the "climate trolls" create to appear numerous as well as to evade the blocks. Accusations of "censorship" follow, apparently raised by those blocked, in new accounts that appear and follow the same objectives, but the editors stand by the policy and note its relative effectiveness.

The broadening of the scope of topics covered (noted above) has drawn criticism from those opposed to the change to an international science news perspective. Those objecting prefer the original exposure for scientific research and developments solely in Australia that had determined the content of ScienceAlert when founded.

The site also has come under criticism for issues related to sensationalism, hyperbole, misleading or naive headlines, and even sexism to attract or engage readers. In a social media post from 2014, feminist STEM blogger Zuleyka Zevallos takes issue with a post on ScienceAlert that she identifies as “sexist”, describing ScienceAlert as “broscience” and “click bait”, both terms for low-content social media posts designed to attract attention. She links it to a greater trend of “using sexism to market science”.

References 

2006 establishments in Australia
Magazines published in Australia
Science and technology magazines
Magazines established in 2006
Popular science magazines